Ogadinma, or Everything Will Be All Right is a novel written by Nigerian author Ukamaka Olisakwe.

References

2020 Nigerian novels